The Deputy Prime Minister of Albania, officially styled the Deputy Prime Minister of the Republic of Albania, is the deputy head of government of Albania. In the absence of the prime minister, the deputy prime minister takes over the functions of chairman of the council of ministers. The office is the second senior minister of the cabinet in the executive branch of the government in the parliamentary system in the Republic of Albania.

Although Albania has always had a Deputy Prime Minister since its independence in 1912. A Prime Minister may choose not to appoint a Deputy Prime Minister. As of the Constitution of Albania, the President of Albania appoints the Deputy Prime Minister and swears before the starting duties in front of the President. The Deputy Prime Minister can take the position of the acting Prime Minister, when the Prime Minister is temporarily absent or incapable of exercising its executive power. The Deputy Prime Minister is often asked to succeed to the Prime Minister's term of office, following the Prime Minister's sudden death or unexpected resignation. However, that is not necessarily mandated by the Constitution of the nation.

Officeholders (1912–present) 
Since the inception of the Fourth Republic, nineteen individuals have occupied the post. The shortest-serving deputy premier was Pali Miska, lasting for 2 months between 22 December 1990 and 22 February 1991. The longest-serving Deputy Prime Minister was Niko Peleshi, who held the deputy premiership continuously from 15 September 2013 to 22 May 2017. of the officeholders after the fall of communism in Albania:

See also 
 Politics of Albania
 Cabinet of Albania

References 

Albania
Politics of Albania